Venus Williams was the defending champion, but lost in the third round to Svetlana Kuznetsova.

Petra Kvitová won the title for a second time, defeating Dominika Cibulková in the final, 6–1, 6–1.

Seeds
The top eight seeds received a bye into the second round.

Draw

Finals

Top half

Section 1

Section 2

Bottom half

Section 3

Section 4

Qualifying

Seeds

Qualifiers

Draw

First qualifier

Second qualifier

Third qualifier

Fourth qualifier

Fifth qualifier

Sixth qualifier

Seventh qualifier

Eighth qualifier

External links 
 Draws

Singles